Manfred Wekwerth (né Weckwerth; 3 December 1929 – 16 July 2014) was a German theatre and film director and writer. He was the director of the Berliner Ensemble theatre from 1977 to 1991. He was also an informant for East Germany's Stasi from 1965 until the German reunification.

Wekwerth was born in Köthen, Saxony-Anhalt. He was married to Renate Richter until his death. They had one child.

Wekwerth died on 16 July 2014 in Berlin, aged 84.

Selected filmography
 Katzgraben (1957)
 Die Mutter (1958)
 Mutter Courage und ihre Kinder (1961)

References

Other websites

 

1929 births
2014 deaths
German autobiographers
Mass media people from Saxony-Anhalt
German theatre directors
People from Köthen (Anhalt)
German male non-fiction writers
Recipients of the Patriotic Order of Merit in gold
People of the Stasi